Tenthredo (from the Greek  tenthrēdōn "earth nesting wasp")  is a genus of sawflies with more than 700 species of the family Tenthredinidae, subfamily Tenthredininae. It is of Holarctic distribution.

Description
Species of this genus are easily recognisable by their wasplike appearance although lacking the thin 'waist' of a true wasp. They have long antennæ. The fore wings of these sawflies have a lance-shaped cell with a straight cross-nervure. Larvae feed on a very wide variety of plants, each species is often restricted to one host; adults prey on flies and other insects in flowers.

List of species

T. abdominalis (Matsumura, 1912)
T. adusta Motschulsky, 1866
T. albiventris (Mocsáry, 1880)
T. alboannulata (Takeuchi, 1933)
T. algoviensis Enslin, 1912
T. amasiensis (Kriechbaumer, 1869)
T. amoena Gravenhorst, 1807
T. amurica Dalla Torre, 1894
T. arctica (C. G. Thomson, 1870)
T. arcuata Forster, 1771
T. arida (Lacourt, 1995)
T. asiatica Enslin, 1910
T. asperrima Lacourt, 1980
T. atra Linnaeus, 1758
T. babai Takeuchi, 1936
T. baetica Spinola, 1843
T. balteata Klug, 1814
T. basizonata Malaise, 1938
T. bifasciata O. F. Müller, 1766
T. bipunctula Klug, 1814
T. bipunctulata Enslin, 1920
T. bizonula (Enslin, 1910)
T. borea Enslin, 1919
T. brachycera (Mocsary, 1909)
T. brevicornis (Konow, 1886)
T. campestris Linnaeus, 1758
T. canariensis (Schedl, 1979)
T. caspia (Ed. André, 1881)
T. caucasica Eversmann, 1847
T. clathrata Enslin, 1912
T. colon Klug, 1814
T. confinis (Konow, 1886)
T. confusa Serville, 1823
T. contigua (Konow, 1894)
T. contusa Enslin, 1920
T. convergenata (Takeuchi, 1955)
T. costata Klug, 1817
T. crassa Scopoli, 1763
T. cunyi Konow, 1886
T. cylindrica (Rohwer, 1911)
T. dahlii Klug, 1817
T. decens Zhelochovtsev, 1939
T. devia (Konow, 1900)
T. diana Benson, 1968
T. distinguenda Stein, 1885
T. eburata Konow, 1900
T. eburneifrons W. F. Kirby, 1882
T. eduardi (Forsius, 1919)
T. emphytiformis Malaise, 1931
T. enslini (Schirmer, 1913)
T. excellens (Konow, 1886)
T. fagi Panzer, 1798
T. ferruginea Schrank, 1776
T. finschi Kirby, 1882
T. flaveola Gmelin, 1790
T. flavipectus (Matsumura, 1912)
T. flavipennis Brullé, 1832
T. flavomandibulata (Matsumura, 1912)
T. frauenfeldii Giraud, 1857
T. fukaii (Rohwer, 1910)
T. fuscoterminata Marlatt, 1898
T. gifui Marlatt, 1898
T. giraudi (Taeger, 1991)
T. grandis (Norton, 1860)
T. hilaris F. Smith, 1874
T. hokkaidonis (Malaise, 1931)
T. ignobilis Klug, 1814
T. jacutensis (Konow, 1897)
T. jakutensis (Konow, 1897)
T. japonica (Mocsary, 1909)
T. jelochovcevi Vassilev, 1971
T. jonoensis Matsumura, 1912
T. jozana (Matsumura, 1912)
T. katsumii Togashi, 1974
T. kiobii Togashi, 1973
T. korabica Taeger, 1985
T. kurilensis (Takeuchi, 1931)
T. lacourti Taeger, 1991
T. largiflava (Enslin, 1910)
T. limbalis Spinola, 1843
T. livida Linnaeus, 1758
T. llorentei (Lacourt, 1995)
T. longipennis (Matsumura, 1912)
T. luteipennis Eversmann, 1847
T. luteocincta Eversmann, 1847
T. maculata Geoffroy, 1762
T. maculipes Serville, 1823
T. mandibularis Fabricius, 1804
T. marginella Fabricius, 1793
T. matsumurai (Takeuchi, 1933)
T. merceti (Konow, 1905)
T. meridiana Serville, 1823
T. mesomela Linnaeus, 1758
T. microps Konow, 1903
T. mioceras Enslin, 1912
T. mitsuhashii (Matsumura, 1920)
T. moniliata Klug, 1814
T. monozonus (Kriechbaumer, 1869)
T. mortivaga Marlatt, 1898
T. nagaii (Togashi, 1963)
T. naraensis Kumamoto, 1987
T. neobesa Zombori, 1980
T. nevadensis Lacourt, 1980
T. nigripleuris (Enslin, 1910)
T. nigropicta (F. Smith, 1874)
T. nitidiceps (Takeuchi, 1955)
T. notha Klug, 1814
T. notomelas Enslin, 1920
T. nympha Pesarini, 1999
T. obsoleta Klug, 1814
T. occupata Kumamoto, 1987
T. okamotoi Inomata, 1967
T. olivacea Klug, 1814
T. omissa Forster, 1844
T. ornata André, 1881
T. ornatularia Shinohara, 1994
T. picticornis (Mocsary, 1909)
T. platycera (Mocsary, 1909)
T. procera Klug, 1814
T. propinqua Klug, 1817
T. providens F. Smith, 1874
T. pyrenaea Taeger & Schmidt, 1992
T. rubricoxis (Enslin, 1912)
T. rubrocaudata (Takeuchi, 1936)
T. sabariensis (Mocsáry, 1880)
T. sakaguchii (Takeuchi, 1933)
T. sapporensis (Matsumura, 1912)
T. schaefferi Klug, 1814
T. scrophulariae Linnaeus, 1758
T. sebastiani (Lacourt, 1988)
T. segmentaria Fabricius, 1798
T. sekidoensis Togashi, 1976
T. semirufa (Ed. André, 1881)
T. shinoharai Togashi, 1974
T. shishikuensis (Togashi, 1963)
T. silensis A. Costa, 1859
T. simplex Dalla Torre, 1882
T. smithiana Togashi, 1977
T. smithii Kirby, 1882
T. sobrina Eversmann, 1847
T. solitaria Scopoli, 1763
T. subolivacea (Takeuchi, 1955)
T. sulphuripes (Kriechbaumer, 1869)
T. takeuchii (Togashi, 1963)
T. tamanukii (Takeuchi, 1936)
T. tanakai Togashi, 1973
T. temula Scopoli, 1763
T. tenuivaginata (Takeuchi, 1955)
T. thompsoni (Curtis, 1839)
T. togashii Kumamoto & Shinohara, 1997
T. trabeata Klug, 1814
T. tsunekii Togashi, 1966
T. umbrica Benson, 1959
T. ussuriensis (Mocsary, 1909)
T. velox Fabricius, 1798
T. versuta Mocsary, 1909
T. vespa Retzius, 1783
T. vespiformis Schrank, 1781
T. vespula Kumamoto & Shinohara, 1997
T. vilarrubiai (Conde, 1935)
T. violettae Lacourt, 1973
T. viridatrix 
T. xanthopus Spinola, 1843
T. xanthotarsis Cameron, 1876
T. yezoensis Kumamoto, 1987
T. zomborii Togashi, 1977
T. zona Klug, 1814
T. zonula Klug, 1814

References 

 Biolib
 Bugguide.net. Genus Tenthredo

Sawfly genera
Tenthredinidae